Big Falls is a waterfall located near the town of Terrebonne in Deschutes County, in the U.S. state of Oregon. Big Falls is a mandatory portage on the right of the cascade. The main channel should not be approached by water craft because of the rocky nature of the riverbed.

See also
 List of waterfalls in Oregon

References

Waterfalls of Oregon
Parks in Deschutes County, Oregon
Waterfalls of Deschutes County, Oregon